Adeline Margaret Tesky (c. 1855 - 21 March 1924) was a Canadian novelist and short story writer.

Biography
Tesky was born in Appleton, a community within the town of Mississippi Mills, Ontario. Her father was Thomas Appleton Tesky a farmer, and her mother was Elisabeth Kerfoot. She attended Genesee College in Lima, New York. She remained single throughout her life. Tesky died of a stroke on March 21, 1924.

Career
Starting in 1900, Tesky taught for two years at Alma Ladies' College in St. Thomas, Ontario. She then became a full-time writer, writing seven novels between 1901 and 1913. Tesky also contributed a number of short stories and poems to various magazines and publications. Her stories regarding rural, farm life are in the style of the kailyard school.

Bibliography
 Where the Sugar Maple Grows (1901)
 The Village Artist (1905)
 Alexander McBain, B.A., Prince in Pernury (1906)
 A Little Child Shall Lead Them (1911)
 The Yellow Pearl: a Story of the East and the West (1911)
 The Little Celestial (1912)
 Candlelight Days (1913)

References

Sources
 McMullen & Campbell, 'New Women: Short Stories by Canadian Women', 1900-1920 (1991), pp. 19–20
 Sandy Campbell, 'Change and the Kailyard: The Fiction of Adeline M. Teskey', Canadian Literature 127 (Winter 1990): 189-93
 Morgan, Henry, 'Canadian Men and Women of the Time' (1912)
 'Woman's Who's Who of America (1914–15)'
 Watters, 'Checklist of Canadian Literature...1620-1960' (1970), p. 405

1855 births
1924 deaths
20th-century Canadian novelists
20th-century Canadian women writers
20th-century Canadian short story writers
Canadian women novelists
McGill University Faculty of Science alumni
Writers from Ontario
Canadian women short story writers